Manuel Antonio Warnes y Durango (1727–1802) was a Spanish military man, who served as regidor and alcalde of Buenos Aires during the Viceroyalty of the Río de la Plata.

Biography 
Warnes was born in Cartagena (Colombia), the son of Patricio Benito Warnes Geer and Juana María Durango y Atienza, belonging to a family of Irish, Flemish and Spanish origin. He had arrived in port of Buenos Aires from Cadiz as Master of the French frigate "Amable Maria". In 1756, he was appointed as alcalde of second vote (vice-mayor) of Buenos Aires, being designated alcalde in first vote in 1775 and 1788.  

His great great grandfather was Salomón Warnes (born in Connacht), banished from Ireland for religious reasons, he had settled in Antwerp, at the beginning of the 17th century.

References

External links 
familysearch.org
familysearch.org

1727 births
1802 deaths
18th-century Spanish military personnel
Spanish colonial governors and administrators
Spanish people of Irish descent
Spanish people of Flemish descent
People from Buenos Aires
Mayors of Buenos Aires
Río de la Plata